East Innisfail is a suburban locality in the Cassowary Coast Region, Queensland, Australia. In the  East Innisfail had a population of 1,855 people.

Geography
The locality is bounded by the Johnstone River to the north, by its tributary the South Johnstone River to the west and by Marty Street to the south.

East Innisfail is directly linked to the Innisfail CBD via the new Jubilee Bridge over the South Johnstone River.

History
Historically the suburb was linked to the CBD by the original Jubilee Bridge, which was built in 1923.

Land for a school was secured by the Department of Lands in 1935. Innisfail East State School opened on 6 March 1936.

In 1930 the local Methodists relocated a church from Chillagoe to Mourilyan Road, East Innisfail.

Radiant Life Christian College opened on 13 February 1982.

At the 2006 census East Innisfail had a population of 1,608.

Due to deterioration from both age and increased traffic flow, the original Jubilee Bridge was closed on 19 July 2010 after concerns were raised over the safety and integrity of the structure. The new Jubilee Bridge was built, which opened on 2 September 2011.

In early 2011, some residents in low-lying areas of the suburb were evacuated ahead of the passing of Cyclone Yasi.  Shortly after there were a number of cases of dengue fever recorded in the suburb.

In the 2011 census, East Innisfail had a population of 1,828 people.

In the  East Innisfail had a population of 1,855 people.

Heritage listings

East Innisfail has a number of heritage-listed sites, including:
 Mourilyan Street: Innisfail Water Tower

Education 
Innisfail East State School is a government primary (Prep-6) school for boys and girls at 92 Mourilyan Road. In 2017, the school had an enrolment of 260 students with 17 teachers (16 full-time equivalent) and 15 non-teaching staff (11 full-time equivalent).

Radiant Life Christian College is a private primary (Prep-7) school for boys and girls at 1 Riley Street. In 2017, the school had an enrolment of 83 students with 6 teachers (5 full-time equivalent) and 11 non-teaching staff. The school has an emphasis on education of Indigenous children but is open to all children.

Darlingia Forest School is an independent primary (Prep-4) school for boys and girls at 89 Mourilyan Road. Opened in 2021, the school has an emphasis on hands-on, outdoor education.

There is no secondary school in East Inisfail; the nearest is in Innisfail State College in neighbouring Innisfail Estate to the north.

Amenities 
The Innisfail Bowls Club is at 1 The Corso at the confluence of the rivers.

The locality has three churches and a park running along the river.

References

External links 

 
Populated places in Far North Queensland
Cassowary Coast Region
Localities in Queensland